321 EOD & Search Squadron 11 EOD Regiment RLC is a unit of the British Army responsible for Explosive Ordnance Disposal and Search duties in Northern Ireland.

The unit was previously titled 321 EOD Unit, then 321 EOD Company RAOC Royal Army Ordnance Corps and was re-badged as a unit of the Royal Logistic Corps in April 1993, now part of 11 Explosive Ordnance Disposal and Search Regiment RLC. With its headquarters at Aldergrove Flying Station near Antrim,  the unit covers the entire province of Northern Ireland. The unit is honoured at the Palace Barracks memorial garden and today remains the most decorated unit in the British Army. 321 is a well equipped unit and has been at the forefront of developing new equipment.

Detachments
Whilst Operation Banner was running, 321 EOD had detachments at the following locations
Derry
Lurgan
Armagh
Omagh
Bessbrook
Belfast
Lisburn
Magherafelt

As at Oct 2015, the Sqn is based at Aldergrove and Palace Barracks in Belfast

References

External links
Soldier Magazine (Nov 1987) feature on 321 EOD
First Light by Paul Wharton - autobiography about the Ulster Campaign

Squadrons of the Royal Logistic Corps
British Army in Operation Banner
Explosive ordnance disposal units and formations